The North Eastern Railway was formed by merger in 1854 and merged into the London and North Eastern Railway at the grouping in 1923. Between those dates five men held the post of Locomotive Superintendent.

In addition many locomotives were inherited from the NER's constituents, and also from subsequent acquisitions, which are not listed here.

Edward Fletcher (1854–1883) 
Edward Fletcher was inherited from the York, Newcastle and Berwick Railway, one of the NER's constituents. There was very little standardization during his term of office, and only a few types are listed here.

Alexander McDonnell (1883–1884) 
Alexander McDonnell moved from the Great Southern and Western Railway of Ireland.
However his policies proved unpopular with the drivers and he resigned after only one year in office.

Locomotive Committee (1884–1885)
Between A. McDonnell and T. W. Worsdell there was an interval during which the office was covered by a Locomotive Committee. The Locomotive Committee was chaired by Henry Tennant.

Thomas William Worsdell (1885–1890) 
T. W. Worsdell was an enthusiast for compounding and many
of his designs used the two-cylinder system of August von Borries, usually in conjunction with simple-expansion versions of the same engines for comparison. The compounds were mostly rebuilt as simple-expansion engines by his brother and successor Wilson Worsdell.

He introduced the system of class designations, starting with "A" for the first, and so on, and then adding a digit for later developments of each. This system was reorganized somewhat in 1914.

Wilson Worsdell (1890–1910)
Wilson Worsdell was the brother of his predecessor.

Vincent Raven (1910–1922) 
Vincent Raven was the last Chief Mechanical Engineer of the North Eastern Railway.

Electric locomotives
All built for 1500 V DC overhead supply, except where noted.

Locomotives built to NER designs after 1922

Locomotives from constituent railways

This is a summary list. For further information, select the link to the constituent railway.

Stockton and Darlington Railway

The Stockton and Darlington Railway (SDR) was absorbed in 1863.  The SDR contributed 157 locomotives to the NER stock and these initially kept their SDR numbers. From 1873, the SDR locomotives were renumbered, mostly by adding 1000.

Preserved locomotives

See also
 LNER locomotive numbering and classification

References

External links

Locomotives of the LNER

 
!North Eastern
British railway-related lists
North Eastern Railway
North Eastern Railway
North Eastern Railway